HMS Curlew was a  light cruiser built for the Royal Navy during World War I.  She was part of the Ceres sub-class of the C class. The ship survived World War I to be sunk by German aircraft during the Norwegian Campaign in 1940.

Design and description
The Ceres sub-class was redesigned to move one of the amidships guns to a superfiring position in front of the bridge to improve its arcs of fire. This required moving the bridge and tripod mast further aft and rearranging the compartments forward of the aft boiler room. She carried  tons of fuel oil. The ship had a crew of about 460 officers and ratings.

The armament of the Ceres sub-class was identical to that of the preceding Caledon sub-class and consisted of five BL 6-inch (152 mm) Mk XII guns that were mounted on the centreline. One superfiring pair of guns was forward of the bridge, one was aft of the two funnels and the last two were in the stern, with one gun superfiring over the rearmost gun. The two QF  20-cwt anti-aircraft guns were positioned abreast of the fore funnel. The Ceress were equipped with eight  torpedo tubes in four twin mounts, two on each broadside.

Construction and career
She was laid down by Vickers Limited on 21 August 1916, and launched on 5 July 1917, being commissioned into the navy on 14 December 1917. In common with most of her sisters Curlew was rearmed to become an anti-aircraft cruiser in 1935–36. 

On the outbreak of war, she served with the Home Fleet.  She participated in the Norwegian Campaign, and whilst operating off the Norwegian coast on 26 May 1940, she came under attack from German Ju 88 bombers of Kampfgeschwader 30 and was sunk in Lavangsfjord, Ofotfjord near Narvik. 9 sailors were lost with the ship.

Notes

Footnotes

Bibliography

External links
 HMS Curlew in WW2 at Naval-History.net
 HMS Curlew at Uboat.net

 

C-class cruisers
Ships built in Barrow-in-Furness
1917 ships
World War I cruisers of the United Kingdom
World War II cruisers of the United Kingdom
World War II shipwrecks in the Norwegian Sea
Maritime incidents in May 1940
Cruisers sunk by aircraft
Ships sunk by German aircraft